Jabłonowo may refer to:

Jabłonowo, Międzychód County in Greater Poland Voivodeship (west-central Poland)
Jabłonowo, Lublin Voivodeship (east Poland)
Jabłonowo, Masovian Voivodeship (east-central Poland)
Jabłonowo, Piła County in Greater Poland Voivodeship (west-central Poland)
Jabłonowo, Działdowo County in Warmian-Masurian Voivodeship (north Poland)
Jabłonowo, Olecko County in Warmian-Masurian Voivodeship (north Poland)
Jabłonowo, Ostróda County in Warmian-Masurian Voivodeship (north Poland)
Jabłonowo, Gryfice County in West Pomeranian Voivodeship (north-west Poland)
Jabłonowo, Wałcz County in West Pomeranian Voivodeship (north-west Poland)

See also
 Yablonovo Russian spelling
 Jablonové (disambiguation) Slovakian spelling